The secretary of state for foreign, Commonwealth and development affairs is a secretary of state in the Government of the United Kingdom, with responsibility for the Foreign, Commonwealth and Development Office. Seen as one of the most senior ministers in the government and a Great Office of State, the incumbent is a member of the Cabinet of the United Kingdom.

The office holder works alongside the other Foreign Office ministers. The corresponding shadow minister is the Shadow Secretary of State for Foreign, Commonwealth and Development Affairs. The performance of the secretary of state is also scrutinised by the Foreign Affairs Select Committee.

The current foreign secretary is James Cleverly MP, appointed in the September 2022 cabinet reshuffle.

Responsibilities
Corresponding to what is generally known as a foreign minister in many other countries, the foreign secretary's remit includes:
 British relations with foreign countries and governments
 Promotion of British interests abroad. 
 Matters pertaining to the Commonwealth of Nations and the Overseas Territories
 Oversight for the Secret Intelligence Service (MI6) and the Government Communications Headquarters (GCHQ).

Residence
The official residence of the foreign secretary is 1 Carlton Gardens, in London. The foreign secretary also has the use of Chevening House, a country house in Kent, South East England and works out of the Foreign Office in Whitehall.

History

The title secretary of state in the government of England dates back to the early 17th century. The position of secretary of state for foreign affairs was created in the British governmental reorganisation of 1782, in which the Northern and Southern Departments became the Foreign Office and Home Office respectively. The India Office which, like the Colonial Office and the Dominions Office, had been a constituent predecessor department of the Foreign Office, was closed down in 1947.

Eventually, the position of secretary of state for foreign and Commonwealth affairs came into existence in 1968 with the merger of the functions of secretary of the state for foreign affairs and the secretary of state for Commonwealth affairs into a single department of state. Margaret Beckett, appointed in 2006 by Tony Blair, was the first woman to have held the post.

The post of secretary of state for foreign, Commonwealth and development affairs was created in 2020 when position holder Dominic Raab absorbed the responsibilities of the secretary of state for international development.

List of foreign secretaries

Secretaries of State for Foreign Affairs (1782–1968)

 Died in office.

Secretaries of State for Foreign and Commonwealth Affairs (1968–2020)
Post created through the merger of the Foreign Office and the Commonwealth Office.

Secretaries of State for Foreign, Commonwealth and Development Affairs (2020–present)
Post created through the merger of the Foreign and Commonwealth Office and the Department for International Development.

See also
 Parliamentary Under-Secretary of State for Foreign Affairs
 Permanent Under-Secretary of State for Foreign Affairs
 Secretary of State for Commonwealth Affairs
 Secretary of State for Commonwealth Relations
 Secretary of State for the Colonies
 Secretary of State for Dominion Affairs
 Foreign minister
 Great Offices of State

References

Further reading
 Cecil, Algernon. British foreign secretaries, 1807–1916: studies in personality and policy (1927). pp. 89–130. online
 Goodman, Sam. The Imperial Premiership: The Role of the Modern Prime Minister in Foreign Policy Making, 1964–2015 (Oxford UP, 2016).
 Hughes, Michael. British Foreign Secretaries in an Uncertain World, 1919–1939. (Routledge, 2004).
 Johnson, Gaynor. "Introduction: The Foreign Office and British Diplomacy in the Twentieth Century," Contemporary British History, (2004) 18:3, 1–12, DOI: 10.1080/1361946042000259279
 Neilson, Keith, and Thomas G. Otte. The permanent under-secretary for foreign affairs, 1854–1946 (Routledge, 2008).
 Otte, Thomas G. The Foreign Office Mind: The Making of British Foreign Policy, 1865–1914 (Cambridge UP, 2011).

 Seldon, Anthony. The Impossible Office? The History of the British Prime Minister (2021) excerpt major scholarly history. Covers the relations with Prime Minister in Chapter 8.

 Steiner, Zara. The Foreign Office and Foreign Policy, 1898–1914 (1986).
 Temperley, Harold. "British Secret Diplomacy from Canning to Grey." Cambridge Historical Journal 6.1 (1938): 1–32.
 Theakston, Kevin, ed. British foreign secretaries since 1974 (Routledge, 2004).
 Wilson, Keith M., ed. British foreign secretaries and foreign policy: from Crimean War to First World War (1987).

External links

FCO website

Foreign relations of the United Kingdom
Ministerial offices in the United Kingdom
Foreign and Commonwealth Affairs, Secretary of State for
Foreign ministers of the United Kingdom
1782 establishments in Great Britain
1782 in politics
1968 in politics
1968 establishments in the United Kingdom
United Kingdom